Anthony Vlachos (born September 10, 1973) is an American police officer, best known for competing on the reality television competition series Survivor, of which he is the second person to win two seasons. He won the show's 28th season, Survivor: Cagayan, as well as the 40th season, Survivor: Winners at War. He also competed in the 34th season, Survivor: Game Changers, where he was the second person voted out.

As a Survivor player, he was noted for his strategic, dominant gameplay, with which he was able to manipulate other contestants while avoiding being voted against at Tribal Council, as well as his humor. Vlachos is also known for his long-lasting "Cops R' Us" partnership with fellow contestant and police officer Sarah Lacina, who won Game Changers, the two participating in the same three seasons they appeared on.

In February 2015, following Vlachos' first season on the show, Survivor host Jeff Probst published a list of his "Top 10 Survivor Winners of All Time," ranking Vlachos fourth, stating that he had "never seen anyone play with that much energy and juggle that many balls at once, and pull it all off." Upon winning the 40th season and its accompanying $2 million prize, Vlachos became the first man to win Survivor twice (and second person altogether after Sandra Diaz-Twine). He has won the most money from Survivor among all contestants, totaling just over $3 million across his three seasons. Martin Holmes of Vulture called Vlachos the "King of Survivor".

Personal life
Vlachos was born on September 10, 1973, the son of Greek immigrants. He grew up in Jersey City, New Jersey, idolizing law enforcement officers, and dreamed of one day becoming one. He graduated high school in 1992, and spent several years working in various different jobs while "partying" with his friends and working on his automobiles. He states that despite this recreational period in his life, he did not smoke, drink alcohol, or do drugs.

He began bodybuilding when he was 20, an activity with which he says he was "obsessed". He began working out in his basement with plastic weights filled with sand, and graduated to iron weights in about a year. In 2000, Vlachos became a Jersey City police officer. On February 5, 2014, he saved a 69-year-old man who had a heart attack on his lawn in nine inches of snow.

In 2007, Vlachos began dating a fellow police officer named Marissa Ann. They dated for approximately three years before he proposed to her on July 24, 2010. They married on June 2, 2012, and their daughter, Anastasia Marie, was born on February 16, 2013, five months before Vlachos left to film Survivor: Cagayan. Two months after arriving home, Vlachos and Marissa discovered she was two months pregnant with their second child, a son they named Constantine Anthony, who was born on June 9, 2014.

As of 2019, Vlachos is a resident of Allendale, New Jersey.

Survivor

Cagayan
Vlachos was cast on the 28th season of the reality television show Survivor, Survivor: Cagayan. The theme of the season was "Brawn vs. Brains vs. Beauty", with participants split into three tribes based on these features. Vlachos was cast on the Aparri "brawn" tribe. Before the first tribal swap, Aparri dominated the immunity challenges and did not go to tribal council. During this time, Vlachos formed an alliance, dubbed "Cops-R-Us", with fellow police officer Sarah Lacina. Despite this alliance, Vlachos lied to Lacina about his profession, claiming he was a construction worker. Vlachos also became close with Trish Hegarty and was wary of the popularity of former NBA All-Star Clifford Robinson. Vlachos was able to find the Aparri tribe's hidden immunity idol with help of the clue he found in the reward they received after winning a challenge. At the final tribal council, the jury ultimately chose him as the winner with a vote of 8-1, beating martial arts instructor Woo Hwang.

Aftermath
In March 2020, Briana Kranich, writing for Screen Rant, ranked  Survivor: Cagayan the best season of Survivor. In a 2015 interview, host Jeff Probst listed Vlachos as one of his top 10 favorite Survivor winners ever, and one of his top 6 favorite male winners, commenting, "I like Tony because he's unlike any winner we've ever had. He's the Tasmanian Devil. He played an incredibly reckless game, but he was so gifted that he could make a mistake and recover because he was lapping you so that he was able to actually catch back up and fix his mistake. It's almost like he had his own time machine. I've never seen anyone play with that much energy and juggle that many balls at once, and pull it all off." In 2016, Vlachos became a part of the Survivor Hall of Fame, along with Tina Wesson and Rupert Boneham.

Game Changers
At the end of the reunion show for the 33rd season, Survivor: Millennials vs. Gen X, Vlachos was confirmed to be a participant in the 34th season: Survivor: Game Changers. Vlachos' strategy for this series was wildly unpredictable, beginning his search for idols immediately after arriving at the beach in full view of his tribemates, framing others by planting an idol in someone else's belongings, and feigning an intimate personal bond with multiple tribe members. Dalton Ross, writing for Entertainment Weekly, called this strategy "one of the most aggressive games ever." However, when he informed Diaz-Twine about his spy bunker, she informed other tribe members, and ultimately campaigned to have him voted out. Despite this, Vlachos later stated in an interview with CBS that because she was voted out after him, the two of them became friends during the considerable time they spent on the pre-jury trip to Vietnam. In a January 2020 interview, he stated that losing Game Changers helped prepare him for Winners at War.

Winners at War 
During the promotional trailer for the season during the reunion show for the 39th season, Survivor: Island of the Idols, Vlachos was confirmed to be a participant in the 40th season: Survivor: Winners at War. Vlachos started on the Dakal tribe.  Vlachos adapted his style to approach the season with a gameplay distinct from his Cagayan strategy, which involved an alliance with fellow police officer Sarah Lacina, surveillance from a spy nest and orchestrating attacks upon lower-threat targets. At the final tribal council, he garnered 12 of the 16 jury votes to win the season.

Filmography

Television

References

External links
"Tony Vlachos". Survivor: Cagayan. CBS.
 Longeretta, Emily (May 21, 2014). "'Survivor: Cagayan' Recap: (Spoiler) Wins It All After Dramatic Finale". Hollywood Life.

Survivor (American TV series) winners
1973 births
Living people
People from Allendale, New Jersey
People from Jersey City, New Jersey
American police officers
American people of Greek descent
Winners in the Survivor franchise